Staraya Orya (İśke Urya) is a rural locality (a village) in Bayguzinsky Selsoviet, Yanaulsky District, Bashkortostan, Russia. The population was 89 as of 2010. There are 2 streets.

Geography 
Staraya Orya is located 21 km southwest of Yanaul (the district's administrative centre) by road. Novaya Orya is the nearest rural locality.

References 

Rural localities in Yanaulsky District